Kadey (also spelled Kadéï, Kadéi, Kadeï or Kadei) is a department of East Province in Cameroon. The department covers an area of 15,884 km and as of 2001 had a total population of 192,927. The capital of the department lies at Batouri.

Subdivisions
 The department is divided administratively into 7 communes and in turn into villages.

Communes

 Batouri
 Kentzou
 Kette
 Mbang
 Ndelele
 Nguelebok
 Ouli

See also
 Kadéï River

References

Departments of Cameroon
East Region (Cameroon)